WJZP-LP (107.9 FM) is a low-power broadcast radio station in Portland, Maine, United States. The station broadcasts a community-based jazz, classic soul and urban gospel format. The station has been on the air since 2005.

The station plays jazz and classic R&B in the afternoon, and uptempo and dance tracks in the evening.

Dennis Ross, the founder, owner, and operator of WJZP, stated that Portland civil rights leader Gerald Talbot was his inspiration for founding a minority-owned radio station. In 2007, he spoke out at the Federal Communications Commission hearing on media ownership issues in Portland.

See also
 List of jazz radio stations in the United States
 List of community radio stations in the United States

References

External links
WJZP-LP official website
 

Community radio stations in the United States
Radio stations established in 2005
JZP-LP
JZP-LP